Fabrizio "Fab" Filippo (born November 30, 1973) is a Canadian actor.

Personal life
Filippo was born in Toronto, Ontario, Canada. His parents are first generation Italian immigrants (his mother is from Campora San Giovanni in Calabria). He briefly attended York University's Film & Video Programme in 1993. In 2006, Filippo married magazine editor Robin Payne, and together they have a son.

Career
His best-known roles include Scott Hope in Buffy the Vampire Slayer, violinist Ethan Gold in Queer as Folk, Dom Ramone in Ready or Not and lawyer Sam Caponelli in Billable Hours, as well as the films waydowntown, The Life Before This and Lives of the Saints. He played the lead role, Roland Travis, in the short lived series Level 9. He also appeared as Johnny, an adolescent who believes he is being stalked by a ghost, in an episode of the popular Nickelodeon series Are You Afraid of the Dark?

Filippo is also active in the Toronto theatre community and focuses on writing for stage and screen. He says "I think it's just the next phase in my career." He played a significant role in the "monster band", a collaborative band effort that opened Mel Lastman Square.

In 2017 he created and starred in the comedy-drama web series Save Me. He received three Canadian Screen Award nominations for his work on the series, in the categories of Best Actor in a Drama Program or Limited Series, Best Direction in a Drama Program or Limited Series and Best Writing in a Drama Program or Limited Series, at the 7th Canadian Screen Awards in 2019.

Filmography

References

External links
 
 

1974 births
Canadian male film actors
Canadian male television actors
Canadian male voice actors
Canadian people of Calabrian descent
Living people
Male actors from Toronto